The 2002–03 Highland Football League was won by Deveronvale. Fort William finished bottom.

Table

Highland Football League seasons
5
Scot